The 1960 Tulsa Golden Hurricane football team represented the University of Tulsa during the 1960 NCAA University Division football season. In their sixth year under head coach Bobby Dodds, the Golden Hurricane compiled a 5–5 record (2–1 against Missouri Valley Conference opponents) and finished in second place in the conference. The team's statistical leaders included Jerry Keeling with 1,018 passing yards, David White with 444 rushing yards, and Jim Furlong with 209 receiving yards.

Schedule

References

Tulsa
Tulsa Golden Hurricane football seasons
Tulsa Golden Hurricane football